The 2016–17 season  was Accrington Stanley's eleventh consecutive season in League Two and their 48th year in existence. Along with competing in League Two, the club also participated in the FA Cup, League Cup and League Trophy. The season covered the period from 1 July 2016 to 30 June 2017.

Transfers

Transfers in

Transfers out

Loans in

Loans out

Competitions

Pre-season friendlies

League Two

League table

Matches

August

September

October

November

December

January

February

March

April

May

FA Cup

EFL Cup

EFL Trophy

Appearances

Numbers in parentheses denote appearances as substitute.

Goalscorers
Includes all competitive matches.

Disciplinary record

References

Accrington Stanley
Accrington Stanley F.C. seasons